Eyal Ben Ami (born August 29, 1976) is a retired Israeli professional footballer who played for Maccabi Ironi Ashdod, Hapoel Tel Aviv, Hapoel Petah Tikva, Ironi Rishon leZion, Hapoel Kiryat Shmona, Hapoel Nazareth Illit,  F.C. Ashdod and Hapoel Kfar Shalem. At international level, Ben Ami was capped at under-21 level and represented the Israel senior team twice.

References

1976 births
Living people
Israeli footballers
Israel international footballers
Israel under-21 international footballers
Hapoel Tel Aviv F.C. players
Hapoel Petah Tikva F.C. players
Hapoel Rishon LeZion F.C. players
Hapoel Ironi Kiryat Shmona F.C. players
Hapoel Nof HaGalil F.C. players
F.C. Ashdod players
Hapoel Kfar Shalem F.C. players
Hapoel Nahlat Yehuda F.C. players
Hapoel Bat Yam F.C. players
Maccabi Ironi Ashdod F.C. players
Jewish Israeli sportspeople
Israeli Premier League players
Liga Leumit players
Association football midfielders
Footballers from Bat Yam